Marino Salas Ortega (born October 2, 1981) is a former Major League Baseball relief pitcher, now playing for the Athletics Bologna in the Italian Serie A Federale.

Career
Salas was previously claimed off waivers from the Baltimore Orioles by the Milwaukee Brewers on February 1, . He played for Milwaukee's Double-A and Triple-A clubs, the Huntsville Stars and the Nashville Sounds. On December 7, 2007, Salas was traded to the Pittsburgh Pirates along with Kevin Roberts for Salomón Torres. He became a free agent at the end of the  season.

He also played in Italy for BSC Rovigo, as a starting pitcher.

On August 1, 2015, he pitched a no-hitter against Grosseto at the Jannella Stadium, in a playoff game.

References

External links

"Salas Traded to Pittsburgh." Huntsville Stars. 7 December 2007.

1981 births
Living people
Águilas Cibaeñas players
Bluefield Orioles players
Bowie Baysox players
Delmarva Shorebirds players
Dominican Republic expatriate baseball players in the United States
Frederick Keys players
Gulf Coast Orioles players
Huntsville Stars players
Indianapolis Indians players

Major League Baseball pitchers
Major League Baseball players from the Dominican Republic
Nashville Sounds players
People from Hato Mayor del Rey
Pittsburgh Pirates players
Estrellas Orientales players
Pericos de Puebla players
Tigres del Licey players
Dominican Republic expatriate baseball players in Mexico
Dominican Republic expatriate baseball players in Italy